Ouedogo may refer to several settlements in Burkina Faso:

 Ouédogo-Bokin, a town in Gounghin Department, Kouritenga Province
 Ouedogo, Sangha, a town in Sangha Department, Koulpélogo Province
 Ouédogo, Koupéla, a village in Koupéla Department, Kouritenga Province